Scales v. United States, 367 U.S. 203 (1961), was a 1960 decision of the United States Supreme Court that upheld the conviction of Junius Scales for violating of the Smith Act on the basis on his membership in the Communist Party of the United States (CPUSA).

Decision
Junius Scales was the leader of the North Carolina branch of the CPUSA. He was convicted in 1955, but the sentence was overturned on appeal due to procedural mistakes by the prosecution. He was retried and convicted again in 1958. Prosecutors pursued Scales' case because he specifically advocated violent political action and gave demonstrations of martial arts skills.

Scales appealed his conviction to the Supreme Court. He contended that the 1950 McCarran Internal Security Act rendered the Smith Act's membership clause ineffective, because the McCarran Act explicitly stated that membership in a communist party does not constitute a per se violation of any criminal statute. On June 5, 1961, the Supreme Court, in a 5–4 decision, upheld the conviction of Scales, finding that the Smith Act membership clause was constitutional because it required prosecutors to prove that there was direct advocacy of violence and that the membership was substantial and active, not passive or technical. Justices Harlan and Frankfurter, who joined the 1957 Yates decision that held that free speech is protected unless it poses a "clear and present danger", joined the majority in Scales.

A New York Times editorial a few days after the decision said that the Court had departed from the "Holmes-Brandeis" view by punishing "membership in a party that advocates violent overthrow" rather than "conspiring to advocate". It continued:

In a letter to the Times, Rep. Francis E. Walter, chair of the House Un-American Activities Committee, countered:

President John F. Kennedy commuted Scales' sentence on Christmas Eve, 1962. Scales was the last person convicted under the Smith Act to be released from prison.

Scales was the last member of the CPUSA convicted under the Smith Act and the only person convicted under its membership clause whose conviction was not overturned on appeal. Others were convicted under the Act for conspiring to overthrow the government. Scales is the only Supreme Court decision to uphold a conviction based solely upon membership in a political party.

See also
Dennis v. United States,  
Noto v. United States, 
Yates v. United States, 
 Smith Act trials of communist party leaders

References

External links

1951 in United States case law
United States Supreme Court cases
United States Free Speech Clause case law
United States due process case law
McCarthyism
Communist Party USA litigation
United States Supreme Court cases of the Vinson Court

zh:丹尼斯诉合众国案